Timothy Dexter (January 22, 1747 – October 23, 1806) was an American businessman noted for his writing and eccentricity.

Biography
Dexter was born in Malden in the Province of Massachusetts Bay. He had little schooling and dropped out of school to work as a farm laborer at the age of eight. When he was 16, he became a tanner's apprentice. In 1769, he moved to Newburyport, Massachusetts. He married 32-year-old Elizabeth Frothingham, a rich widow, and he then bought a mansion with the money. 

At the end of the American Revolutionary War, he purchased large amounts of depreciated Continental currency that was worthless at the time. At the war's end, the U.S. government made good on its notes at one percent of face value, while Massachusetts paid its own notes at par. His investment enabled him to amass a considerable profit. He built two ships and began an export business to the West Indies and Europe.

Because he was largely uneducated, his business sense was considered peculiar. He was advised to send bed warmers—used to heat beds in the cold New England winters—for resale in the West Indies, a tropical area. This advice was a deliberate ploy by rivals to bankrupt him. His ship's captain sold them as ladles to the local molasses industry and made a handsome profit. Next, Dexter sent wool mittens to the same place, where Asian merchants bought them for export to Siberia.

People jokingly told him to "ship coal to Newcastle". Fortuitously, he did so during a Newcastle miners' strike, and his cargo was sold at a premium. On another occasion, practical jokers told him he could make money by shipping gloves to the South Sea Islands. His ships arrived there in time to sell the gloves to Portuguese boats on their way to China.

He exported Bibles to the East Indies and stray cats to Caribbean islands and again made a profit; Eastern missionaries were in need of the Bibles and the Caribbean welcomed a solution to rat infestation. He also hoarded whalebones by mistake, but ended up selling them profitably as corset stays.

While subject to ridicule, Dexter's boasting makes it clear that he understood the value of cornering the market on goods that others did not see as valuable and the utility of "acting the fool".

New England high society snubbed him. Dexter bought a large house in Newburyport from Nathaniel Tracy, a local socialite, and tried to emulate him. He decorated this house with minarets, a golden eagle on the top of the cupola, a mausoleum for himself, and a garden of 40 wooden statues of famous men, including George Washington, William Pitt, Napoleon Bonaparte, Thomas Jefferson, and himself. The last had the inscription, "I am the first in the East, the first in the West, and the greatest philosopher in the Western World". Dexter also bought an estate in Chester, New Hampshire. 

Despite his good fortune, his relationship with his family suffered. He frequently told visitors that his wife (who was actually alive) had died, and that the woman frequenting the building was simply her ghost. In one notable episode, Dexter faked his own death to see how people would react, and about 3,000 people attended Dexter's mock wake. When Dexter did not see his wife cry, he revealed the hoax and promptly caned her for not sufficiently mourning his death.

Writing

At age 50, Dexter authored the book A Pickle for the Knowing Ones, in which he complained about politicians, the clergy, and his wife. The book contains 8,847 words and 33,864 letters, but without any punctuation and with unorthodox spelling and capitalization. One section begins: 

The first edition was self-published in Salem, Massachusetts, in 1802. Dexter initially distributed his book for free, but it became popular and was reprinted eight times. The second edition was printed in Newburyport in 1805. In the second edition, Dexter responded to complaints about the book's lack of punctuation by adding an extra page of 11 lines of punctuation marks with the instruction that printers and readers could insert them wherever needed—or, in his words, "thay may peper and solt it as they plese".

Legacy

Dexter attempted to burnish his own legacy by enlisting the efforts of Jonathan Plummer, a fish merchant and amateur poet, who extolled his patron in verse: 

Some of his social contemporaries considered him very unintelligent; his obituary considered "his intellectual endowments not being of the most exalted stamp".

The Probate Office valued his estate at $35,027.39 (roughly ).

Dexter's Newburyport house became a hotel. Storms ruined most of his statues; the only identified surviving statue was that of William Pitt.

In 1984 Prof. William Quill, who was raised on Johnston Street in Newburyport, purchased Timothy Dexter's House for $200,000 and restored it.

References

Sources

External links

The Official Virtual Seat on the "Noue Systom of Knollege & Lite" Assigned the Notable and Most Noble Lord Timothy Dexter
A Pickle For The Knowing Ones, at Project Gutenberg
Complete transcription of "A Pickle for The Knowing Ones; or Plain Truths in a Homespun Dress" ~ with translation and annotations
NPR’s "Weekend Edition": The 'Literary' Legacy of Lord Timothy Dexter

1747 births
1806 deaths
Businesspeople from Massachusetts
Writers from Newburyport, Massachusetts
People from Malden, Massachusetts
People who faked their own death
Burials at Old Hill Burying Ground
Colonial American merchants
People of colonial Massachusetts
American colonial writers